Nettalk may refer to the following:

NETtalk (artificial neural network)
Nettalk (IRC client)